The River Clarin is a fast-flowing river in Ireland, flowing through southern County Galway.

Course

The River Clarin rises in the townland of Gortnalone, north of Attymon and snakes westwards, turning southwards through Athenry. Athenry Castle was built at a fording point on the river. It flows southwestwards and passes under the N18 at Clarinbridge and enters Dunbulcaun Bay.

Wildlife

Fish species include Crayfish, trout, salmon, lamprey and eel.

See also
Rivers of Ireland

References

Clarin